Burn O'Vat is a pothole located close to Loch Kinord near the village of Dinnet in Aberdeenshire, Scotland.

Formation
Around 16,000 years ago, the area surrounding Burn O'Vat was covered by a glacial ice sheet. As the area warmed around 14 000 years ago, the ice sheet began to melt, resulting in a torrent of meltwater that carried with it debris previously caught up in the glacial ice. This debris, consisting of rocks and boulders, is thought likely to be the most important component of the formation of Burn O'Vat.

It is thought that a rock from the meltwater stream lodged in a small hollow on the river bed, causing the meltwater to flow around it in a spiralling motion. This spiralling motion caused the bed underneath the rock to erode over a long period of time, creating a feature known as a pothole.

Around 13 500 years ago the volume of meltwater decreased to such a level that the stream began to deposit more than it was eroding. This change resulted in the deposition of sand and gravel into the bottom of the pothole. It is believed that this sediment extends down around 5–7 metres, below the current ground level, though no-one can be certain of the true value.

The pothole, known locally as 'The Vat', measures 18 metres across and 13 metres high, from present ground level.

Approximately 12 000 years ago, the entrance to the vat was exposed when the rock in front of it was undercut by the same stream that formed the vat, albeit in the form of a waterfall.

The Vat Burn
The Vat burn is the stream which resulted in the formation of the vat, and which now runs through it. The source of the burn lies 1.2 kilometres east of the vat on Culblean Hill. The burn flows due east, through the vat, to its mouth at Loch Kinord. The burn is 2.2 kilometres in length, with an average width of 2.7 metres.

History of the Vat
According to local folklore, the cave behind the waterfall in the vat was used by Rob Roy, a notorious outlaw, to hide from the authorities. In fact, this is not true, with the cave instead being used as a hiding place for Patrick Gilroy Macgregor, an outlaw renowned for his exploits in Deeside during the 17th century and a possible relative of Rob Roy.

Video of Gilderoy and the Burn O'Vat (2018)

The Vat Today
In modern times, the Vat has become a popular tourist attraction, offering many walks around the area, as well as into the Vat itself. The Vat also has its own visitor centre which provides the opportunity to see taxidermy models of local wildlife, as well as giving detailed explanations of the formation of the local topography. The visitor centre, as well as the Vat itself, are acknowledged as four-star visitor attractions by the Scottish Tourist Board.

References

External links
Scottish Geology Website
Royal Deeside Visitor Attractions
Geograph Square for Burn O'Vat
Video of Gilderoy and the Burn O'Vat

Landforms of Aberdeenshire
Tourist attractions in Aberdeenshire
Canyons and gorges of Scotland